Spilosoma fusifrons is a moth in the family Erebidae. It was described by Francis Walker in 1865. It is found in southern India.

Description

Female

White. Head in front and palpi brown. Thorax with six black dots. Abdomen pale luteous, with three rows of black spots. Forewings with many irregular black spots, and with a black excavated middle band. Hindwings with a black discal spot, and with a macular submarginal black band; underside with a black interior patch extending from the costa to the disk. Length of the body 6 lines; of the wings 18 lines.

References

Natural History Museum Lepidoptera generic names catalog

Moths described in 1865
fusifrons